David C. Brown was an English professional footballer who played as a centre forward for Burnley.

References

Year of birth missing
Year of death missing
English footballers
Association football forwards
Burnley F.C. players
English Football League players